Zhangziying Town is a town located on the eastern portion of Daxing District, Beijing, China. It borders Majuqiao Town in its north, Caiyu Town in its east, Wanzhuang Town in its south, as well as Anding and Qingyundian Towns in its west. It had a total population of 34,588 as of 2020.

The name Zhangziying is taken from Zhangzi County on southern Shanxi, where many of the original settlers of Zhangziying were from.

History

Administrative divisions 
As of 2021, Zhangziying Town wcovereds 43 subdivisions, composed of 42 villages and 1 industry park:

See also 

 List of township-level divisions of Beijing

References 

Towns in Beijing
Daxing District